When You Lie Next to Me is the debut studio album by American country music artist Kellie Coffey. It was released on May 7, 2002 by BNA Records. "When You Lie Next to Me," "At the End of the Day" and "Whatever It Takes" were all released as singles. The title track was Coffey's highest charting single, reaching No. 8 on the Billboard country charts in 2002. The album is Coffey's only studio album affiliated with a professional record label.

Critical reception
Stephen Thomas Erlewine of Allmusic rated the album three stars out of five, describing Coffey as "a more approachable Faith Hill— her polished country-pop is every bit as urbane, yet it doesn't feel as glamorous." Country Standard Time reviewer Jeffrey B. Remz compared her vocals to those of Sara Evans, saying that Coffey's voice was "strong [and] full-bodied" but added that he thought the album lacked a sense of identity.

Track listing

Personnel
Tim Akers – keyboards
Bruce Bouton – steel guitar
Mike Brignardello – bass guitar
David Campbell — string arrangements
Lisa Cochran – background vocals
J. T. Corenflos – electric guitar
Eric Darken – percussion
Paul Franklin – steel guitar
Dann Huff – electric guitar
Kim Keyes – background vocals
Billy Kirsch – piano
Paul Leim – drums
Brent Mason – electric guitar
Steve Nathan – keyboards
Chris Rodriguez – background vocals
Brent Rowan – electric guitar
Russell Terrell – background vocals
Biff Watson – acoustic guitar
John Willis – acoustic guitar
Glenn Worf – bass guitar
Jonathan Yudkin – fiddle, mandolin, cello

Charts

Weekly charts

Year-end charts

References

2002 debut albums
BNA Records albums
Kellie Coffey albums
Albums produced by Dann Huff